Beautifully Human: Words and Sounds Vol. 2 is the second studio album by American singer Jill Scott, released on August 31, 2004, by Hidden Beach Recordings. It debuted at number three on the Billboard 200 and number one on the Billboard Top R&B/Hip-Hop Albums with first-week sales of 193,000 copies, earning Scott her first number-one album. The song "Cross My Mind" brought Scott her first Grammy Award, in the Best Urban/Alternative Performance category in 2005.

"Golden" appears in the films Beauty Shop (2005) and Obsessed (2009), as well as on Grand Theft Auto IV fictional soul/R&B radio station The Vibe 98.8.

"Bedda at Home" is used as the website background music for the Hotel Missoni.

Track listing

Sample credits
 "Family Reunion" contains elements of "Look Over Your Shoulder" by the Escorts.
 "Rasool" contains a sample of "Mellow Mood Pt. 1" by Barry White.

Charts

Weekly charts

Year-end charts

Certifications

Notes

References

2004 albums
Albums produced by Dre & Vidal
Albums produced by James Poyser
Albums produced by Raphael Saadiq
Hidden Beach Recordings albums
Jill Scott (singer) albums
Sequel albums